was a Japanese samurai of the mid-Edo period. The 5th son of Tokugawa Munetake with his wife Konoe Moriko (1721-1786), posthumously named Horen-in, he succeeded his father as head of the Tayasu branch of the Tokugawa house. His childhood name was Kotobuki-maro (寿麻呂) and later Suemaru (寿丸).

1753 births
1774 deaths
Samurai
Tokugawa clan